Udalguri Assembly constituency is one of the 126 assembly constituencies of Assam Legislative Assembly. Udalguri forms part of the Mangaldoi Lok Sabha constituency.

Members of Legislative Assembly 
 2021: Gobinda Chandra Basumatary, United People's Party Liberal

Election results

2021 result

References

External links 
 

Assembly constituencies of Assam